The Kuban oblast was a province (oblast) of the Caucasus Viceroyalty of the Russian Empire. It roughly corresponded to most of the Kuban and Circassia regions. It was created in 1860 out of Kuban Cossack territories that had once been part of the Crimean Khanate and the land of the Circassians. It was dissolved upon the assumption of supreme authority by the Kuban Rada in 1917 and the independence of the Kuban People's Republic in 1918. Its capital was the city of Yekaterinodar (present-day Krasnodar).

Administrative divisions
The Cossack districts (otdels) of the Kuban oblast in 1917 were as follows:

Structure 
The militarized nature of the Kuban meant that, rather than a traditional governorate (guberniya) with counties (uezds), the territory was administered by the Kuban Cossacks as an oblast which was split into otdels. Each otdel had its own sotnias which in turn would be split into stanitsas and khutors. The ataman ("commander") for each region was not only responsible for the military preparation of the Cossacks, but for the local administration duties. Local stanitsa and khutor atamans were elected, but approved by the atamans of the otdel. These, in turn, were appointed by the supreme ataman of the Kuban host, who was in turn appointed directly by the Russian emperor. Prior to 1870, this system of legislature in the oblast remained a robust military one and all legal decisions were carried out by the stanitsa ataman and two elected judges. Afterwards, however, the system was bureaucratized and the judicial functions were independent of the stanitsas.

Demographics

Russian Empire Census 
The plurality of the population indicated Ukrainian to be their mother tongue, with a significant Russian speaking minority.

Kavkazskiy kalendar 

Notes

References

Bibliography 

 
Caucasus Viceroyalty (1801–1917)
Oblasts of the Russian Empire
History of Kuban
States and territories established in 1860
States and territories disestablished in 1917
1860 establishments in the Russian Empire
1917 disestablishments in Russia
Governorates of the Caucasus